is a 1992 Japanese comedy film directed by Yoji Yamada. It stars Kiyoshi Atsumi as Torajirō Kuruma (Tora-san), and Kumiko Goto as his nephew Mitsuo's Hidetaka Yoshioka love interest or "Madonna", Izumi. It also co-stars Masatoshi Nagase, who plays Mitsuo's rival for Izumi's affection and Mari Natsuki as Izumi's mother.  Tora-San Makes Excuses is the forty-fifth entry in the popular, long-running Otoko wa Tsurai yo series.

Cast
 Kiyoshi Atsumi as Torajirō
 Chieko Baisho as Sakura
 Jun Fubuki as Choko
 Masatoshi Nagase as Ryusuke
 Masami Shimojō as Kuruma Tatsuzō (Torajirō's uncle )
 Chieko Misaki as Tsune Kuruma (Torajirō's aunt)
 Hisao Dazai as Boss (Umetarō Katsura)
 Hidetaka Yoshioka as Mitsuo Suwa
 Kumiko Goto as Izumi Oikawa
 Gin Maeda as Hiroshi Suwa
 Mari Natsuki as Ayako Oikawa
 Gajirō Satō as Genkō
 Keiroku Seki as Ponshu
 Chishū Ryū as Gozen-sama

Critical appraisal
The German-language site molodezhnaja gives Tora-san Makes Excuses three and a half out of five stars.

Availability
Tora-san Makes Excuses was released theatrically on December 26, 1992. In Japan, the film was released on videotape in 1993 and 1996, and in DVD format in 2002 and 2008.

References

Bibliography

English

Japanese

External links
 Tora-san Makes Excuses at www.tora-san.jp (official site)

1992 films
Films directed by Yoji Yamada
1992 comedy films
1990s Japanese-language films
Otoko wa Tsurai yo films
Shochiku films
Films with screenplays by Yôji Yamada
Japanese sequel films
1990s Japanese films